Harvie is both a given name and a surname. Notable people with the name include:

Given name
Harvie Andre (1940–2012), Canadian engineer and politician
Harvie Branscomb (1894–1998), American theologian and academic administrator
Harvie Ferguson, British Professor of Sociology
Harvie Pocza (born 1959), Canadian ice hockey player
Harvie S (born 1948), American bassist
Harvie Ward (1925–2004), American golfer
J. Harvie Wilkinson III (born 1944), American jurist
also
Harvie Krumpet fictional character and animated movie

Surname
Betty Harvie Anderson (1913–1979), British Conservative politician
Bob Harvie (died 2010), announcer with Radio Ceylon
Christopher Harvie (born 1944), Scottish historian and politician
Derek Harvie (born 1971), Canadian TV and film writer and producer
Ellie Harvie (born 1965), Canadian actress
Ellison Harvie (1902–1984), Australian architect
Eric Harvie (1892–1975), Canadian lawyer and oilman
George Harvie-Watt (1903–1989), British Conservative politician.
Iain Harvie (born 1962), guitarist with Del Amitri
Ian Harvie American stand-up comedian
John Harvie Sr. (1706–1767), Scottish immigrant, planter, and guardian of Thomas Jefferson. Father of John Harvie
John Harvie (1742–1807), American lawyer and builder
Patrick Harvie (born 1973), Scottish politician
R. W. Harvie (1868–1922), photographer father of Ellison Harvie

See also
Harvey (disambiguation)

Surnames
English-language surnames
Scottish surnames
Surnames from given names